Adab (Hindustani: آداب (Nastaleeq), आदाब (Devanagari)), from the Arabic word Aadaab (آداب), meaning respect and politeness, is a hand gesture used in the Indian subcontinent, by the Urdu-speaking while greeting, as well as many non-Muslims (Hindus and Christians) in north India. It is associated with the Ganga-Jamuni culture of South Asia, especially of the Urdu-speaking communities of Uttar Pradesh, Hyderabadi Muslims, and Muhajir people of Pakistan.

History 
Since the religious greeting of Muslims i.e. "Assalamu Alaikum" was meant for Muslims only, and Muslims in India lived in a multi-faith and a multi-lingual society, this alternative form of greeting was coined. Its use became so pervasive in the high culture of northern and central India that it was not considered inappropriate to reply to 'salaam' with 'aadaab' and vice versa and it was used frequently in non-Muslim households as well. The use of Aadab is especially popular in the Indian city of Hyderabad, where religious pluralism has been historically emphasized; the Nizam of the region stated: "Hindus and Muslims are like my two eyes ... How can I favor one eye over the other?" In some localities of India and Pakistan, the phrase and gesture has decreased in use because it is perceived as insufficiently Islamic compared to other greetings, though it is preferred by many who still use it due to its inclusive nature.

Description 
The gesture involves raising the right hand towards the face with palm inwards such that it is in front of the eyes and the finger tips are almost touching the forehead, as the upper torso is bent forward. It is typical for the person to say "adab arz hai" (Nastaleeq: آداب عرض ہے, Devanagari: आदाब अर्ज़ है), meaning "I offer my respects to you", or simply just "aadab".
It is often answered with the same or the word "tasleem" is said as an answer or sometimes it is answered with a facial gesture of acceptance.

In popular culture today, the adab is often associated with the courtly culture of the Muslim Nawabs.

See also
Civilian salutes
Greetings
Hindu-Muslim unity

References

Hand gestures
Islamic culture
Islam in South Asia
Greeting words and phrases of Bangladesh
Greeting words and phrases of India
Greeting words and phrases of Pakistan
Gestures of respect

ar:أدب